Chiodos was an American post-hardcore band, formed in Davison, Michigan, in 2001. The group has released four studio albums, three extended plays, eight singles, eight music videos.

Albums

Studio albums

Extended plays

Featured albums

Singles

Music videos

Discographies of American artists
Rock music discographies